The canton of Lure-2 is an administrative division of the Haute-Saône department, northeastern France. It was created at the French canton reorganisation which came into effect in March 2015. Its seat is in Lure.

It consists of the following communes:
 
Amblans-et-Velotte
Andornay
Arpenans
Les Aynans
La Côte
Faymont
Frotey-lès-Lure
Genevreuille
Lomont
Lure (partly)
Lyoffans
Magny-Danigon
Magny-Jobert
Magny-Vernois
Moffans-et-Vacheresse
Mollans
Palante
Pomoy
Roye
Le Val-de-Gouhenans
Vouhenans
Vy-lès-Lure

References

Cantons of Haute-Saône